University Grants Commission is the body responsible for funding most of the State Universities in Sri Lanka, and operates within the frame work of the Universities Act No. 16 of 1978. A public organisation, established under the Parliament Act No 16 of 1978. Location is at No 20, Ward Place Colombo 07.

It distributes public money, allocated by the Government for teaching and research to universities and university affiliated institutes, as such controls much influence and appointments at state universities.

Functions
The official functions of the UGC are;
 Allocation of funds to Higher Educational Institutions (HEIs) that come under it
 Planning and co-ordination of university education
 Maintenance of academic standards
 Regulation of the administration of HEIs 
 Regulation of student admissions to HEIs

The Commission members

The Universities Act provides for seven members of the Commission appointed by the President. These are:
 Senior Prof. Sampath Amaratunge – Chairman   
 Senior Prof. Janitha A Liyanage –  Vice-Chairperson
 Rev. Prof. Kollupitiye Mahinda Sangharakkitha Thero – Commission Member
 Senior Prof. A K W Jayawardane – Commission Member 
 Prof. (Ms.) Vasanthy Arasaratnam – Commission Member
 Prof. Premakumara de Silva – Commission Member
 Mr. Palitha Kumarasinghe  – Commission Member

The following attend the meetings of the Commission but are not members and do not vote:
 Mr. R H W A Kumarasiri  – Treasury Representative who advises the Commission on funds 
 Dr. Priyantha Premakumara – Secretary to the Commission

Higher Educational Institutions controlled by the UGC
University of Colombo
University of Colombo School of Computing 
Institute of Indigenous Medicine 
Institute of Worker's Education 
National Institute of Library and Information Science 
National Center for Advanced Studies in Humanities & Social Sciences 
Institute of Biochemistry, Molecular Biology and Biotechnology (IBMBB) 
Postgraduate Institute of Medicine, Colombo
Sri Palee Campus
University of Peradeniya
Postgraduate Institute of Science, Peradeniya 
Postgraduate Institute of Agriculture, Peradeniya 
University of Sri Jayewardenepura
University of Kelaniya
Gampaha Wickramaracchi Institute of Ayurvedic Medicine
Postgraduate Institute of Pali & Buddhist Studies, Colombo 
University of Moratuwa
Institute of Technology, Moratuwa 
University of Jaffna
Vavuniya Campus
University of Ruhuna
Open University, Sri Lanka
Eastern University, Sri Lanka
Swamy Vipulananda Institute of Aesthetic Studies
Trincomalee Campus 
Rajarata University of Sri Lanka 
Sabaragamuwa University of Sri Lanka
Uva Wellassa University
Wayamba University of Sri Lanka
University of the Visual & Performing Arts
South Eastern University of Sri Lanka
Gampaha Wickramarachchi University of Indigenous Medicine
National Center for Advanced Studies

See also
Universities in Sri Lanka

References

External links
 University Grants Commission of Sri Lanka

University organizations
University governance
Statutory boards of Sri Lanka
Higher education in Sri Lanka